Gwangju Global Motors Co. Ltd. (GGM) is a joint venture manufacturing plant between Hyundai Motor Company and the Gwangju city government. Opened in 2021, it is the first new automobile manufacturing plant in South Korea since 1998. The first model produced by the plant, the Hyundai Casper rolled off of GGM’s production line in September 2021. The plant have the capacity to produce 70,000 vehicles a year. It is the only Hyundai-operated manufacturing plant in South Korea without the presence of workers unions, which enables average annual pay to be less than half than other Hyundai plants.

Gwangju Metropolitan Government is the largest shareholder with an investment of 48.3 billion won (21 percent stake). Hyundai Motor Company, which invested 43.7 billion won, is the second-largest shareholder (19 percent). Of the total project cost of 575.4 billion won, the remaining 60% (345.4 billion won) excluding equity capital of 230 billion won was drawn up from the financial sector.

Current models 
 Hyundai Casper (2021–present)

External links
Official website 

Automotive companies established in 2019
Companies based in Gwangju
Multinational companies headquartered in South Korea
South Korean companies established in 2019
Hyundai Motor Company

References